The Gates of Hell is a sculpture by Auguste Rodin.

Gates of Hell, Gate of Hell or Door to Hell may also refer to:
 Gates of hell, one of various legendary geographic locations 
 Gate of Hell (film), a 1953 Japanese samurai film
 City of the Living Dead, a 1980 Italian horror film
 The Gates of Hell (1986 novel), a novel by C. J. Cherryh and Janet Morris in the fantasy series Heroes in Hell
 The Gates of Hell (Livingston novel), a 2016 historical fiction/fantasy novel by Michael Livingston
 Another name for the Darvaza gas crater, a burning natural gas deposit near Derweze, Turkmenistan
 Call to Arms: Gates of Hell (video game), a DLC for the Call to Arms game

See also
 Hell Gate (disambiguation)
 Hellgate (disambiguation)
 Hells Gate (disambiguation)